Just Business is the fourth studio album by American punk rock band, Bass Drum of Death. The album was released on July 27, 2018, through Century Media Records.

Background 
On June 1, 2018, the second single and title track "Just Business" was released. Impose praised the track for its more mature lyrics and described the style of the song as "a soaked signature fuzz we’ve all come to know and love from Bass Drum of Death".

Track listing 
 "Third Coast Dreaming" (2:47)
 "Too High" (3:47)
 "Diamond in the Rough" (3:02)
 "Failing Up" (2:57)
 "Heavy" (2:16)
 "I Don't Wanna Know" (3:14)
 "Odds Are Good" (3:44)
 "Just Business" (4:05)
 "I Love You (I Think)" (3:05)
 "I Thought I Told You" (3:29)
 "Leaving" (2:49)

Critical reception 

Thus far Just Business has received mixed reviews from contemporary music critics. Writing for Flood Magazine,  Jonathan Pruett felt the album lacked a consistency, "his ability to leap from genre to genre (a bit of Only Ones pub-punk here, a bit Interpol-esque grandiose post-punk there) leaves you flustered."

References 

2018 albums
Bass Drum of Death albums
Century Media Records albums